Mahmut Özen (born 1 September 1988) is a Turkish footballer who plays as a defender.

Career

Club career

Early career
Özen started his professional career in 2008 at the then Division 4 club Stafsinge IF based in Falkenberg. For the 2009 season he moved to Varbergs BoIS where he played for three seasons, two seasons in Division 2 and one season in Division 1. Özen transferred to Allsvenskan club Mjällby AIF for the 2012 season. After having only played five matches for the club in his debut season, Özen made a breakthrough for the 2013 season where he played a majority of the club's matches.

Malmö FF
On 3 December 2013 it was announced that Özen had signed a four-year-long contract with the reigning league champions Malmö FF. Özen will wear the number 24 shirt for the club. The transfer went through on 10 January 2014 when the Swedish transfer window opened. After having only appeared in only one league match for the club during the 2014 season, Özen was sent on loan to Turkish Süper Lig side Kayseri Erciyesspor until the end of the 2014–15 season.

Adana Demirspor
On 7 January 2016 it was confirmed, that Özen had signed a contract with Adana Demirspor.

Falkenbergs FF
Özen signed for Falkenbergs FF on 13 March 2017.

Career statistics
As of 28 November 2018.

Honours

Club
Malmö FF
 Allsvenskan: 2014

References

External links
 
 
 Malmö FF profile 
 
 

1988 births
Living people
People from Tarsus, Mersin
Turkish footballers
Swedish footballers
Swedish people of Turkish descent
Association football defenders
Allsvenskan players
Superettan players
Ettan Fotboll players
Division 2 (Swedish football) players
Süper Lig players
TFF First League players
Mjällby AIF players
Malmö FF players
Kayseri Erciyesspor footballers
Falkenbergs FF players
Footballers from Stockholm